The Exempted Limited Partnership Law, 2014 (Law 5 of 2014) is a statute of the Cayman Islands. It was passed on 2 July 2014.

Section 50 of the Law repeals the Exempted Limited Partnership Law, 2013.

See also
Law of the Cayman Islands

References
The Exempted Limited Partnership Bill. Cayman Islands Gazette.
Cayman Islands: The Exempted Limited Partnership Law 2014. The Lawyer.
Changes To The Cayman Islands Exempted Limited Partnership Law. Mondaq.

Caymanian law
2014 in law
2014 in the Cayman Islands